John Robert Thomas, Sr. (October 11, 1846 – January 19, 1914), also known as J. R. Thomas, was a U.S. representative from Illinois. He was later appointed a U.S. district judge in the Indian Territory, which then encompassed most of the eastern part of present-day Oklahoma, serving from 1898 to 1901. After statehood, he served on the Oklahoma State Code Commission which was tasked with reviewing and editing the new state laws that had been hastily put together during the rush to statehood. After returning to his private law practice, he went to the Oklahoma state prison at McAlester to interview an inmate on January 19, 1914, when he was killed by three other inmates who shot him to death while escaping prison.

Judge Thomas was also the father of Carolyn T. Foreman, who married banker Grant Foreman in 1905. After their marriage and the judge's death, Carolyn and Grant become noted Oklahoma historians.

Biography
Born in Mount Vernon, Illinois, Thomas attended the common schools and Hunter Collegiate Institute, Princeton, Indiana. He served in the Union Army during the Civil War, and rose from the rank of private to that of captain of Company D, One Hundred and Twentieth Regiment, Indiana Volunteer Infantry. He was wounded at the Battle of Franklin, Tennessee. Wilson wrote that he never fully recovered from his wound.

After the war, Thomas studied law and was admitted to the bar in 1869. He became city attorney of Metropolis, Illinois, 1869 and 1870 and served as State's attorney 1871–1874.

U.S. House of Representatives
Thomas was elected as a Republican to the Forty-sixth and to the four succeeding Congresses (March 4, 1879 – March 3, 1889). He served as chairman of the Committee on Levees and Improvements of the Mississippi River (Forty-seventh Congress).

In 1883, Thomas was one of only seven House Republicans to vote against the Pendleton Civil Service Reform Act, which replaced the traditional spoils system with a bureaucratic civil service system. The conservative "Stalwart" faction of the Republican Party which earlier opposed civil service reform almost entirely voted for the Pendleton Act under immense political pressure following the assassination of James A. Garfield.

He was not a candidate for renomination in 1888.

Later career
He resumed the practice of law in Muskogee, Oklahoma, and also served as a United States judge in the Indian Territory from June 30, 1897, to June 30, 1901. During this service, he handed down the first death penalty ever issued in the Territory. In 1899, he tried a group of white men who were arrested and convicted of torturing and murdering two Seminole boys. The men were convicted of the crimes, which angered a great many white settlers.

Although he personally favored the two-state proposal for Oklahoma statehood, he later realized that the national government, which was dominated by his own party, would never approve the possibility of adding four more Democratic senators in Washington D. C. So, he changed his mind and supported the single-state proposal at the Republican convention. He was nominated for judge of the supreme court by the first Republican State convention of Oklahoma, but declined the nomination. Instead, he served as member of the Oklahoma State Code Commission 1908–1910.

He died in McAlester, Oklahoma on January 19, 1914, and was interred in Green Hill Cemetery, Muskogee, Oklahoma. He was reinterred later in Arlington National Cemetery.

Death
According to an account by J. Stanley Clark that appeared in the Chronicles of Oklahoma in 1974, Judge Thomas had gone to the penitentiary to interview Abraham Collier, who was serving a seven-year sentence for larceny. While he was in the Warden's office, an attempted jailbreak occurred. Three other convicts, each armed, broke into the office and ordered everyone inside to stand up. Following the possession of a gun by three prisoners, they took keys to unlock themselves from their confinement spaces and barged into offices to use stenographer Mary Foster as a human shield. When the convicts barged into the warden's room, they demanded everyone else to surrender with their hands in the air. Thomas, who was described as physically stout, did not respond quickly, reached for his cane, and was fatally shot in the heart.

The intruders then killed Assistant Warden D. D. Oates, day sergeant, F. C. Godgrey, H. H. Dover, and wounded three other people.

Family
He was the son of Major William Allen Thomas and Caroline (Neely) Thomas. He married Charlotte "Lottie" Maria Culver in 1870. Their daughter, Carolyn, who married Grant Foreman, was an author and historian who wrote several books about Native Americans and the history of Oklahoma. A son, John R. Thomas Jr., was a "celebrated hero of the Spanish–American War with the Rough Riders." Thomas-Foreman Historic Home In 1884, while serving as US Congressman, John Robert Thomas was also Grand Master for the Ancient Free and Accepted Masons of the State of Illinois.

Notes

References

1846 births
1914 deaths
Burials at Arlington National Cemetery
Indian Territory judges
People of Indiana in the American Civil War
District attorneys in Illinois
People from Mount Vernon, Illinois
People from Metropolis, Illinois
Politicians from Muskogee, Oklahoma
Union Army officers
Republican Party members of the United States House of Representatives from Illinois
19th-century American politicians
Illinois lawyers
Oklahoma lawyers
19th-century American judges
19th-century American lawyers
Military personnel from Illinois